The Ansel Adams Wilderness is a wilderness area in the Sierra Nevada of California, United States. The wilderness spans ; 33.9% of the territory lies in the Inyo National Forest, 65.8% is in the Sierra National Forest, and the remaining 0.3% covers nearly all of Devils Postpile National Monument. Yosemite National Park lies to the north and northwest, while the John Muir Wilderness lies to the south.

History
The wilderness was established as part of the original Wilderness Act in 1964 as the Minarets Wilderness. The  Minarets Wilderness was created by enlarging and renaming the Mount Dana-Minarets Primitive Area.

In 1984, after his death, the area was expanded and renamed in memory of Ansel Adams, well-known environmentalist and nature photographer who is famous for his black-and-white landscape photographs of the Sierra Nevada.

Geography and Geology

The centerpiece of the Ansel Adams wilderness is the Ritter Range, which includes dark metavolcanic glaciated mountains such as Mount Ritter, Banner Peak, and The Minarets.

Immediately to the east of the Ritter Range is the Middle Fork of the San Joaquin River, which contains Devils Postpile, a series of basaltic columns that were revealed and smoothed by glacier action. The Middle Fork originates from Thousand Island Lake, at the foot of Banner Peak, one of the largest backcountry lakes in the Sierra.

This relatively low region of the Crest allows winter storms through and cause large amounts of snowfall on Mammoth Mountain, which sits in the gap. The gap also allows migration of plants and animals across the Sierra Crest.

To the west of the Ritter Range lies the canyon of the North Fork of the San Joaquin, a relatively remote and unvisited high-country area.

Ecology

The area above treeline contains alpine meadows and fellfields, with a large number of glacial lakes. Below treeline, the wilderness is dominated by lodgepole pine, red fir, and Jeffrey pine, depending on elevation.

Recreation
The wilderness contains  of hiking trails, including portions of the John Muir and Pacific Crest Trails. The Sierra High Route, an off-trail route described by Steve Roper, runs along the base of the Ritter Range, through the wilderness.

The Middle Fork of the San Joaquin receives the most visitors: a mandatory bus is required for visitors to reach Devils Postpile from the Mammoth Mountain Ski Area during the summer.

The Minarets are a well-known area for technical rock climbing.

Winter brings various cross-country ski possibilities, accessible from both Mammoth Mountain and the June Mountain ski area.

See also 

 Bibliography of the Sierra Nevada, for further reading

References

Sierra National Forest Wilderness Page
Inyo National Forest

External links

 Sierrawild.gov: Ansel Adams Wilderness website
 
 Wilderness.net: Ansel Adams Wilderness
 Summitpost.org: Ansel Adams Wilderness
 TopoQuest map of Ansel Adams Wilderness Area
 Virtualparks.org: QTVR photos of the Ansel Adams Wilderness Area

Wilderness areas of California
Protected areas of the Sierra Nevada (United States)
Inyo National Forest
Sierra National Forest
Protected areas of Fresno County, California
Protected areas of Madera County, California
Protected areas of Mono County, California
Protected areas established in 1964
1964 establishments in California
 
Ansel Adams